Gudrun was a powerful storm which hit Denmark and Sweden on 8 January 2005, and Latvia and Estonia on 9 January 2005. The name Erwin was chosen by the Free University of Berlin, while the storm was named Gudrun by the Norwegian Meteorological Institute and was the name used in Sweden.

This resulted in Sweden at the time having the world's largest surplus of lumber.

About 415,000 homes lost power in Sweden and several thousand of these were without power for many days and even weeks in some cases, as about 10,000 homes were still without power after three weeks. The death toll in Sweden was 7 victims, making it one of the biggest environmental disasters in Swedish history, while four were killed in Denmark and one in Estonia.

Meteorological history

On January 6, 2005, a low pressure system developed at a frontal zone south of Newfoundland. It moved into the central North Atlantic and was named 'Erwin' by the Free University of Berlin. Erwin moved quickly, and was already moving over Scotland and Northern Ireland on the 8th. In the UK, temperatures were noticeably higher after the passing of Erwin. Over much of Central and Western Europe, temperatures were very mild. Erwin began slowing down as it moved into Central Russia. On 13 January, Erwin dissipated over Russia.

Impact

Carlisle and Cumbria flooding
In the UK, the main impacts of the storm was flooding in Cumbria and Carlisle, where 1,800 homes were flooded in the city.

Sweden blackout and damage to forests
Gudrun is one of the strongest storms to impact Sweden in the last 100 years. It caused much damage to forests in Halland the southwestern part of the South Swedish highlands (Småland). Spruces were particularly hit by Gudrun, while other trees with a more steady root system fared better. Damage was also exacerbated by the practice of clearcutting, leaving many trees exposed. Gudrun also caused blackouts and disabled telecommunications infrastructure.

Aftermath

Byholma Wood Stockpile
The cyclone created the world's largest wood stockpile which Gizmodo lists as containing  of wood as of May 2012.

Political impact in Sweden

The Storm also had a dramatic impact on the Swedish political landscape. In Sweden Erwin is better known as Storm Gudrun. In a dissertation from the Department of Government at Uppsala University, entitled  "Natural Disasters and National Election", PhD Lina M. Eriksson found in her research that the storm played a crucial role in the 2006 historic regime shift that occurred in the 2006 Swedish parliamentary election. The results from this research show that the 2002-2006 incumbent Social Democratic Party's (S) poor crisis response to Gudrun, which is the hitherto most costly natural disaster in Swedish history, alone has an estimated effect of a magnitude that likely was crucial to the 2006 historic regime shift.  In the abstract to the thesis one can read "The 2002-2006 incumbent Social Democratic Party (S) received its lowest voter support since 1914 as roughly 150,000, or 8%, of the 2002 S voters went to the main opposition, the conservative Moderate Party (M). This became the most decisive factor in ousting S from power after 12 years of rule. As a result, the M-led Alliance (A) with the People's Party (FP), the Center Party (C), and the Christian Democrats (KD) won the election. Natural Disasters and National Election makes the novel contribution of proposing two natural disasters, the Indian Ocean's 2004 Boxing Day Tsunami and 2005 Storm Gudrun (Erwin), which struck only two weeks following the tsunami, as major events that impacted government popularity in the 2006 election and contributed to the redistribution of voter support, within and across party-blocs. The core findings from this thesis show that the S government's poor crisis response to Gudrun, which is the hitherto most costly natural disaster in Swedish history, alone has an estimated effect of a magnitude that likely contributed to the 2006 historic regime shift, while the tsunami also seems to have mattered. The tsunami is particularly interesting, as S's poor international crisis response to the event constitutes the first natural disaster situation to knowingly have affected an election on the other side of the planet. Moreover, to some degree voters recognized the active opposition by C as effective representation and rewarded the party for its strong stance on the poor handling of both events by S. In fact, the active voice of C concerning these disasters likely helped move the party from the periphery of party politics to becoming the third-largest party in Swedish politics. In sum, this research investigates accountability and effective party representation via retrospective voting, which is an essential mechanism for the legitimacy of democracy. Findings suggest that the average Swedish voter indeed may be voting retrospectively to hold publicly elected officials accountable, which suggest a healthy status of the retrospective voting mechanism and Swedish democracy." Part of the dissertation has also been published in Electoral Studies, which is to be considered the leading scientific journal in election research. In the article long-term effects are also found over the 2010 and 2014 election, which implies that the Storm triggered long-lasting changes in voter support from the left to the right side of the political spectrum. A comprehensive summary of the dissertation is available for download via Uppsala University.

See also
Cyclone Anatol
Cyclone Per
European windstorm
Sting jet

References

Danish page with wind speeds and satellite image - From the Danish Meteorological Institute (in Danish).
Guy Carpenter report on Windstorm Erwin / Gudrun – January 2005 - A report for the insurance business with detailed information about the storm.

External links
Windstorm Erwin / Gudrun – January 2005, Guy Carpenter

Gudrun
Gudrun
Gudrun
2005 in Denmark
2005 in Sweden
2005 meteorology
2005 natural disasters
January 2005 events in Europe